Särkänniemi (translates to "Cape of Sandbank") is an amusement park in Tampere, Finland, located in the district by the same name. The park features an aquarium, a planetarium, a children's zoo, an art museum and an observation tower Näsinneula (Näsi Needle). Särkänniemi is the second most popular amusement park in Finland with Linnanmäki in Helsinki being the most popular one. Särkänniemi has five rollercoasters: the inverted coaster Tornado, the flying coaster Trombi, the family motorcycle launch coaster MotoGee and Hype, a launched steel Sky Rocket II coaster, and family coaster Vauhtimato ("Speedy Worm"). The half-pipe coaster called Half Pipe was recently removed due to multiple reasons. Särkänniemi is owned by the city of Tampere and attracts about 1,100,000 visitors annually.

Särkänniemi is the biggest rival for Linnanmäki as the lead amusement park in Finland. Both are about the same size.
The park gave up the dolphinarium in 2016 and the dolphins were safely transported to Attica Zoological Park in Greece. The park has more than 30 rides and attractions. There are also two water rides in the park, a log flume called Tukkijoki and a river rapids called Koskiseikkailu. Särkänniemi has been voted several times as the best leisure center and the greatest amusement park in Finland.

In the future, a hotel and spa with restaurants and water experiences are planned around the amusement park, as well as new apartments. It will also be possible to travel to the area by tram in the future as part of the Tampere light rail network.

History
This multi-purpose park is owned by the city of Tampere and boasts a variety of rides as well as both Aquarium and Planetarium was opened in 1969, a children's zoo that opened in 1970, a 168m tall Observation Tower that opened in 1971, The Sara Hilden Art Museum opened in 1979, and the Dolphinarium opened in 1985.

The amusement park aspect of Särkänniemi started in 1973 with the opening of Neulan Huvipuisto (Neula Amusement Park); in the beginning the park offered only a handful of children's rides. In 1975 the city of Tampere took over the operations of the fun park and integrated it into other attractions on the peninsula.

Located on the peninsula, about a kilometre from the city centre of Tampere, that juts out into the Black Gulf. The area used to house three different breweries in the 18th century onward and in the 20th century a huge warehouse serving the log industry was built on the peninsula of Särkänniemi. These buildings were demolished in the 1960s.

The park is easily accessible by bus lines 4 and 16.

The 25-acre amusement park is not divided into specifically themed sections although one area is called Kiddie Land and in 2012 an Angry Birds Land was opened.

Rides

Operating Coasters

Defunct Coasters

Flat rides 

X – Giant Discovery Revolution rotating 360° pendulum ride that opened in 2016; height limit 1.4m. Zamperla.
High Voltage – Power Surge, high-impact thrill ride that opened in 2014; height limit is 1.3m. Zamperla.
Tyrsky – Disk'O Coaster that opened in 2009; height limit 1.2m. Zamperla.
Take Off – Breakdance spinner that opened in 2006; height limit 1.3m. Huss.
BOOM – Zamperla Z-Max drop tower that opened in 2019; height limit 1.4m. Zamperla.

Water rides 
Koskiseikkailu – this Rapids Adventure ride was opened in 1999. Intamin; a 6-passenger boat journeys a 490 meters course with a tunnel and a waterfall.
Tukkijoki – a log flume ride that opened in 1982. Reverchon, Tamperer; a 400 meter long course with 3 drops, the highest of which is 13 m tall.

Other rides 
Audi Racing – bumper cars that opened in 1986. Reverchon.
Funny House – walkthrough 
Gazebo – swing ride that opened in 1996. Gerstlauer.
Hurricane – giant swing that opened in 1991; height limit 1.2m. Mondial.
Planetarium – opened in 1969.
Troika – troika spinner ride that opened in 1975; height limit 1m. Huss.
Viking Ship – swinging Viking ship that opened in 1988. Zierer.
Ilmaveivi – wave swinger that opened in 1989. Zierer.

Kiddie rides
Angry Birds – play area with kiddie rides that opened in 2012. Lappset / Rovio.
Angry Birds Obstacle Course – obstacle course that opened in 2012. Lappset.
Angry Birds Ride – Zamperla jump around that opened in 2012. Zamperla.
Bounce Castel – bouncy castle for kids only.
Candy Carousel – merry go round that opened in 1993. Bertazzon.
Coffee Cups – spinning cups for kids only. Soriani&Moser.
Convoy Truck Race – convoy trucks for kids only. Cosetto.
Crazy Bus – crazy bus ride. Zamperla.
Lady Bird – roundabout. Modern Products.
Little Ladybird – mini roundabout for young kids only. Modern Products.
Magic Bikes – magic bike ride that opened in 2008. Zamperla.
Mushroom Race – roundabout ride. Modern Products.
Old Timers – on track cars that opened in 1981. Ihle.
Pavilion Carousel – carousel for kids. Modern Products.
Piggy Train – mini train for kids only that opened in 1994. Zamperla.
Pirate Ship – small swinging pirate ship. Modern Products.
Red Baron – airplanes. Soriani & Moser.
Regatta – roundabout boat ride. Soriani & Moser.
Rocking Tug – rocking tug ride that opened in 2004. Zamperla.
Turtle Train – mini train for kids only that opened in 1999. Zamperla.

Other attractions

The Aquarium at Särkänniemi was opened in 1969. The lower floor of the aquarium includes a mangrove swamp habitat that is home to monos, archer fish, gourami fish, rainbow sharks and blowfish.
The Children's Zoo that opened in 1970 has over 30 different species of animals on show.
Näsinneula Observation Tower that opened in 1971 is 168 meters tall and it has a restaurant on the top floor.
Sara Hilden Art Museum opened in 1979 and has on display works from mostly contemporary Finnish artists.
Creepy Carnival is a horror-themed festival held annually in autumn.

References

External links 

Amusement parks in Finland
Buildings and structures in Tampere
Aquaria in Finland
Tourist attractions in Tampere
1975 establishments in Finland
Parks and attractions with Angry Birds exhibits
Amusement parks opened in 1975